The women's javelin throw at the 2015 World Championships in Athletics was held at the Beijing National Stadium on 28 and 30 August.

There were eight automatic qualifiers out of the first round.  With the best mark qualifiers, the German team was able to get four into the finals including defending champion Christina Obergföll, the home team was able to get two when Lü Huihui got in with the tenth qualifier.  World leader Sunette Viljoen also could not make the automatic but got into the finals while the world record holder Barbora Špotáková did get an automatic.

The partisan locals were overjoyed when Lü took over the lead with a 63.80 and three throws later Li Lingwei improved upon that with a 64.10, putting the home team in first and second place.  That lead held through the second round as closest anybody could come was Viljoen at 63.09 to take third place.  Obergföl started the third round with a new leader 64.61, but Lü came back with an answer of 64.72 which held the lead until the next thrower Katharina Molitor threw it 2 cm further.  Špotáková barely made 60 and didn't get to make the last three throws.  In the fourth round, Viljoen threw 65.79 to move into the lead and as the fifth round was ending, Lü uncorked a 66.13 to set a new Asian Record and take the lead to a furious ovation.  That was the status going into the last throw of the competition.  Molitor had seen her leading position drop to third place over the last 2 rounds but found the answer, a 67.69 to let the air out of the crowd.

Records
Prior to the competition, the records were as follows:

Qualification standards

Schedule

Results

Qualification
Qualification: 63.50 m (Q) or at least 12 best performers (q).

Final
The final was started at 18:45

References

Javelin throw
Javelin throw at the World Athletics Championships
2015 in women's athletics